Montmartin-sur-Mer is a commune in the Manche department in Normandy in north-western France.

See also
 History of this charming small Normandy seaside town and local artist Felix Planquette
Communes of the Manche department

References

Montmartinsurmer
Populated coastal places in France